Bear Creek Falls is the final of the two waterfalls on the North Fork Skykomish River.  The falls are located within a short, narrow canyon.

The falls, at just 25 feet high, are quite insignificant, however are quite significant in terms of how much water is flowing over them.  They drop about 8 meters in a series of cascades and punchbowls.  Because the gorge is rather twisted, it is hard to see portions of the falls let alone photograph them.

References 

Waterfalls of Washington (state)
Waterfalls of Snohomish County, Washington
Tiered waterfalls